Sinai and Gulf Corner Centre ( – Kūy Sīnā va Khelīj Markazī) is a planned community/village in Sulqan Rural District, Kan District, Tehran County, Tehran Province, Iran. At the 2006 census, its population was 60,755, in 15,125 families.

References 

Populated places in Tehran County
Planned communities